Segah is a musical modal system in traditional mugham music.

This is the third mode and consists of 0.5-1-1 tone which is created in amalgamation of three tetra-chords with the reach method. Segah mugam associated with love, romantic feelings at listener. Subgenres of Segah includes: egah Zabul-Segah-Bardasht, Maye, Muya, Manandi-Mukhalif, Segah, high-pitched tone Zabul, Manandi-Hisar (in high-pitched tone), Manandi-Mukhalif (in high-pitched tone), Ashig-Kush, Mubarriga, Zabul, space for Segah, Kharij Segah-Bardasht, Maye, Takhtigah, Mubarriga, Manandi-Hisar, Manandi-Mukhalif, high-pitched tone Segah, space for Kharij Segah. Other mugams relating to the Segah are: Hashym Segah-sol, Kharij Segah-si, Mirza-Huseyn-lya, Orta Segah-mi, Zabul Segah.

In classical Turkish music "si" pitch, and the melody type in this pitch.

References 

Azerbaijani music
Modes (music)
Mugham modes
Radif (music)

az:Segah